Chauvigné (Gallo: Chauveinyaé) is a commune in the Ille-et-Vilaine department in Brittany in northwestern France.

Geography

The communes bordering are Tremblay, Saint-Marc-le-Blanc, Le Tiercent, Saint-Christophe-de-Valains, Vieux-Vy-sur-Couesnon and Romazy.

Population
Inhabitants of Chauvigné are called Chauvignéens in French.

See also
Communes of the Ille-et-Vilaine department

References

External links

 Geography of Brittany
 The page of the commune on infobretagne.com
 

Communes of Ille-et-Vilaine